Pokrovka is a rural locality (a selo) in Plyasovatskoye Rural Settlement, Verkhnekhavsky District, Voronezh Oblast, Russia. The population was 95 as of 2010.

Geography 
Pokrovka is located 19 km northeast of Verkhnyaya Khava (the district's administrative centre) by road. Plyasovatka is the nearest rural locality.

References 

Rural localities in Verkhnekhavsky District